William Perkins (born 8 October 1986) is a West Indian cricketer. He is a right-handed batsman who occasionally plays as wicketkeeper.

Perkins first came to prominence playing for the West Indies in the 2006 Under-19 Cricket World Cup, where he scored 133 from 150 balls in a victory against the United States, an innings that won him the man of the match award. His performances in the tournament earned him a Twenty20 debut for Trinidad and Tobago in the Stanford 20/20 tournament. In his first match, he scored 53 from 28 balls in an eight-wicket win. He subsequently made his first-class debut in January 2007.

Continued domestic success in Twenty20 cricket – in his first nine games, he averaged more than 40 at a strike rate of over 125 – earned him a place in the West Indies team for a Twenty20 International against Australia. Opening the innings in a match shortened to eleven overs per side, he scored 9 in a seven-wicket victory.

Having helped Trinidad and Tobago to victory in the Stanford 20/20, scoring an unbeaten half-century in the final, Perkins was included in the initial squad for the team to face England in the Stanford Super Series for a collective prize of $20 million and attended a training camp, but did not make the final squad.

External links

References 

Trinidad and Tobago cricketers
West Indies Twenty20 International cricketers
Combined Campuses and Colleges cricketers
Guyana Amazon Warriors cricketers
1986 births
Living people
Trinbago Knight Riders cricketers
Barbados Royals cricketers
Wicket-keepers